INEC may refer to:

Ilocos Norte Electric Cooperative
Independent National Electoral Commission, Nigeria
National Institute of Statistics and Census (disambiguation) (Portuguese and Spanish abbreviation: INEC)